Yurkud is a town in the southwestern Gedo region of Somalia. It was the site of the Battle of Yurkud (2012).

References
Yurkud

Populated places in Gedo